Velko Kanev (1948–2011) was a Bulgarian comedic actor. He was also one of the founding members of the Bulgarian comedy show (and musical group) Klub NLO (Клуб НЛО).

1948 births
2011 deaths
20th-century Bulgarian male actors
21st-century Bulgarian male actors
Bulgarian male stage actors
People from Elhovo